Attorney General Parsons may refer to:

Angas Parsons (1872–1945), Attorney-General of South Australia
James A. Parsons (1860s–1945), Attorney General of New York
Theodore D. Parsons (1894–1978), Attorney General of New Jersey

See also
General Parsons (disambiguation)